Dean Burry (born 1972 in St. John's, Newfoundland) is a Canadian composer, librettist, and educator. He is known for being one of the composers of The Hobbit.

Early life
Burry began his passion in music at age 10. He was inspired by a teacher to compete in piano competitions. He was also interested in theater, writing plays and musicals for his school drama club.

College
Burry first attended college at Mount Allison University in Sackville, New Brunswick. While at Mount Allison, he produced and conducted The Resurrection, Joe and Mary Had a Baby, and Unto the Earth: Vignettes of a War. He later went to the University of Toronto and studied composition studies.

Awards
In 2011, Burry was given the Louis Applebaum Composers Award.

Music

Operas
Unto the Earth: Vignettes of a War
The Brothers Grimm (for the Canadian Opera Company) 
The Hobbit (for the Canadian Children’s Opera Company) 
The Vinland Traveller 
Isis and the Seven Scorpions (for the Canadian Opera Company) 
Pandora's Locker (for The Glenn Gould School at The Royal Conservatory of Music)
A Creature of Habit 
Baby Kintyre 
The Mummers' Masque 
The Bremen Town Musicians (for Opera Lyra Ottawa)
Angela and Her Sisters 
The Secret World of OG (for the Canadian Children’s Opera Company) 
Le nez de la sorcière 
The Bells of Baddeck 
The Sword in the Schoolyard 
Shanawdithit (for Tapestry Opera)

Musical Theatre
Under the Night
Emily of New Moon 
Rainbow Valley 
Songs of the Island (for the Charlottetown Festival)
Home and Away (for Live Bait Theatre)
The Heart That Knows (for Live Bait Theatre)
Sweetheart: The Mary Pickford Story
Beacon of Light

See also
Music Contributors from The Hobbit
List of Canadian composers
List of University of Toronto people

References

External links
Dean Burry Interview on Brothers Grimm opera

1972 births
Living people
Canadian composers
Canadian male composers
Musicians from St. John's, Newfoundland and Labrador
University of Toronto alumni
Mount Allison University alumni